Steve Waldman may refer to:

 Steven Waldman, editor-in-chief, president, and co-founder of Beliefnet
 Steve Randy Waldman (born 1970), computer programmer and writer
 Steven D. Waldman (born 1951), pain management specialist